Lakewood Theater is an historic theater located in Lakewood, Dallas, Texas (USA). The restored Streamline Moderne theater, built in 1938, shows classic films and hosts many contemporary musical and comedy events.

External links 
Lakewood Theater

Landmarks in Dallas
Theatre in Dallas
Streamline Moderne architecture in Texas